Peng Chang-kuei (September 26, 1919 – November 30, 2016) was a Taiwanese chef who is sometimes credited with being the creator of General Tso's chicken, a popular Chinese dish in Western countries.

Early life
Peng was born on September 26, 1919, in Changsha, Hunan Province in the Republic of China. He cooked for the Nationalist government, serving as personal chef to Chiang Kai-shek, before fleeing to Taiwan in 1949.

Culinary career
Peng first prepared his new Hunanese dish of chicken and chilies, naming it after General Zuo Zongtang, at a state banquet during the First Taiwan Strait Crisis. Peng then served General Tso's chicken in his restaurants in Taipei. When Hunanese restaurants opened in New York City in 1972, they served an adapted version of General Tso's chicken.
 
Peng emigrated to New York City in 1973 and opened his own restaurant, Uncle Peng's Hunan Yuan, near the United Nations. He returned to Taiwan in the 1980s to open a chain of Peng Yuan restaurants, later opening a branch in his hometown of Changsha.

Personal
Peng married three times and had seven children. He died from pneumonia in Taipei, Taiwan in November 2016.

References

External links

The Strange Tale of General Tso
Legacy.com Peng Chang-kuei

Taiwanese people from Hunan
1919 births
2016 deaths
Chinese chefs
People from Changsha
Chinese Civil War refugees
Deaths from pneumonia in Taiwan